The 2008 New Jersey Republican presidential primary took place on February 5, 2008, with 52 national delegates.

Results

* Candidate dropped out of the race before the primary

See also
 2008 New Jersey Democratic presidential primary
 2008 Republican Party presidential primaries

References

New Jersey
2008 New Jersey elections
2008
2008 Super Tuesday